Woman Walks Ahead is a 2017 American biographical drama Western film directed by Susanna White and written by Steven Knight. The film is the story of Catherine Weldon (Jessica Chastain), a portrait painter who travels from New York City to the Dakotas in 1890 to paint a portrait of Sitting Bull (Michael Greyeyes). Chaske Spencer and Sam Rockwell also star.
 
The film premiered at the Toronto International Film Festival September 10, 2017. It was released through DirecTV Cinema on May 31, 2018, before being released in a limited release on June 29, 2018, by A24.

Premise
Catherine Weldon, a Swiss-American portrait painter, travels from Brooklyn, New York to the Dakotas in the 1890s to paint a portrait of Sitting Bull. She becomes embroiled in the Lakota people's struggle over the rights to their land.

Cast
Jessica Chastain as Catherine Weldon, painter and confidante to Sitting Bull
Michael Greyeyes as Sitting Bull
Sam Rockwell as Colonel Silas Grove
Ciarán Hinds as James McLaughlin, a US Indian agent
Michael Nouri as Karl Valentine
Chaske Spencer as Chaska, a local lawman
Bill Camp as General Crook
Rulan Tangen as Susan McLaughlin
Rachel Singer as Dry Goods Assistant
Louisa Krause as Loretta
Lyle Sandoval as Tracker

Production
On February 3, 2016, it was reported that Jessica Chastain was in talks to play Sitting Bull's confidante in Woman Walks Ahead, directed by Susanna White. On September 14, 2016, Michael Greyeyes, Sam Rockwell, Ciarán Hinds, Chaske Spencer, and Bill Camp joined the cast, with principal photography having begun in New Mexico.

Release

The film had its world premiere at the Toronto International Film Festival on September 10, 2017. Shortly after, A24 and DirecTV Cinema acquired distribution rights to the film. Its U.S. premiere was at the Tribeca Film Festival on April 25, 2018.

It was released through DirecTV Cinema on May 31, 2018, before being released in a limited release on June 29, 2018.

Reception
On review aggregator website Rotten Tomatoes, the film holds an approval rating of 59% based on 44 reviews, and an average rating of 5.9/10. The site's critical consensus reads, "Woman Walks Ahead gets some extra mileage out of watchable work from Jessica Chastain and Michael Greyeyes, but uneven pacing and two-dimensional characters undermine their efforts." On Metacritic, which assigns a rating to reviews, the film has a weighted average score of 51 out of 100, based on 19 critics, indicating "mixed or average reviews".

Despite mixed reviews, Michael Greyeyes received critical acclaim for his portrayal of Sitting Bull. The New York Times critic Jeannette Catsoulis called his performance "a miracle of intelligence and dignity". RogerEbert.com contributor Susan Wloszczyna raved about his performance, calling it "the most subtle, soulful, and believable". Los Angeles Times and Village Voice critics described his presence as captivating as “wry wit and quiet gravity”, while the latter described his performance as "stirring".

References

External links
 

2017 films
American biographical drama films
British biographical drama films
2017 biographical drama films
2010s English-language films
Lakota-language films
Films directed by Susanna White
Films scored by George Fenton
Films with screenplays by Steven Knight
Films about Native Americans
Cultural depictions of Sitting Bull
Films shot in New Mexico
A24 (company) films
2017 drama films
Films set in the 1890s
Films set in South Dakota
Films set in North Dakota
2017 multilingual films
American multilingual films
British multilingual films
2018 Western (genre) films
2010s American films
2010s British films